Benedetti is an Italian surname. Notable people with the surname include:

Alessio Benedetti (born 1990), Italian footballer
Alessio Benedetti (footballer, born 1997), Italian professional footballer
Amedeo Benedetti (writer) (1954–2017), Italian scholar and writer
Amedeo Benedetti (footballer) (born 1991), Italian footballer
Ângelo Sampaio Benedetti, or simply Ângelo (born 1981), Brazilian footballer
Armando Benedetti (born 1967), Colombian politician
Arturo Benedetti Michelangeli (1920–1995), Italian pianist
Atilio Benedetti (born 1955), Argentine politician
Cesare Benedetti (born 1920), Italian footballer and painter
Cesare Benedetti (cyclist) (born 1987), Italian cyclist
Enrico Benedetti (born 1940), Italian ice hockey player
Fabrizio Benedetti, Italian neuroscientist
Franco Benedetti (born 1932), Italian wrestler
Georges Benedetti (1930–2018), French politician
Giacomo Benedetti (born 1999), Italian footballer
Giambattista Benedetti (1530–1590), Venetian mathematician
Giovanni Benedetti (1917–2017), Italian Roman Catholic bishop
Jonatan Benedetti (born 1997), Argentine professional footballer
Joseph B. Benedetti (1929–2014), American lawyer and politician
Josefina Benedetti (born 1953), Venezuelan-American composer and choral director
Leonardo Benedetti (born 2000), Italian football player
Lorenzo Benedetti (born 1992), Italian footballer
Mario Benedetti (1920–2009), Uruguayan writer
Myria Benedetti (born 1975), Thai singer, actress and model
Nicola Benedetti (born 1987), Scottish violinist
Sergio Benedetti (1942–2018), Italian art historian
Silvano Benedetti (born 1965), Italian footballer and youth team coach
Simone Benedetti (born 1992), Italian footballer, son of Silvano
Stefania Benedetti (born 1969), former Italian female long-distance runner
Vincent, Count Benedetti (1817–1900), French diplomat
Yvan Benedetti (born 1965), French far-right activist

See also
Benedetti–Wehrli Stadium, a stadium in Illinois
Benedetta
Benedetto (disambiguation)

Italian-language surnames
Patronymic surnames
Surnames from given names